Gillespie Field  is a county-owned public towered airport  northeast of downtown San Diego, in El Cajon, San Diego County, California, United States.

History
 Section reference dates.
In September 1942 Camp Gillespie was completed and named in honor of Lieutenant Archibald H. Gillespie, a Marine officer who played a prominent role in the effort to separate California from Mexico in the 1840s.

In February 1944, the camp was commissioned as Marine Corps Auxiliary Airfield Gillespie under the command of Marine Corps Air Station El Toro.  MCAAF Gillespie soon became responsible for Camp Pendleton Outlying Air Field.  Among the units that transited and trained at MCAAF Gillespie were VMSB-141, Air Warning Squadron 10 and the Navy's TBM-3 Avenger torpedo squadron VT-37.

In 1946 the airfield was turned over to San Diego County and became a general aviation facility.

In 1952 the County was granted ownership of the facility by the federal government.

The last race was run in 2004, and the County started expansion of the airport onto  of this land in 2005.

In 1971 the County Sheriff stationed ASTREA, a helicopter law enforcement base at the airport, and in 1993 the San Diego Aerospace Museum located its restoration operations and an exhibit at the field.

Facilities and operations
 Runway 9L/27R: 
 Runway 9R/27L: 
 Runway 17/35: 

For the 12-month period ending December 31, 2016 the airport had 226,887 aircraft operations, average 622 per day: 99.8% general aviation, <1% air taxi and <1% military. At that time there were 547 aircraft are based at the airport: 86% single-engine, 7% multi-engine, 3% helicopter, 3% jet and 1% glider.

San Diego Air & Space Museum Gillespie Field Annex

Gillespie is the home of the restoration facility Gillespie Field Annex for the San Diego Air and Space Museum (formerly San Diego Aerospace Museum).  It is open to the public and has on display many vintage and modern aircraft. It has an Atlas ICBM rocket as its gate guard, a recently restored F-102A Delta Dagger with drop tanks and AIM-4A Falcon missiles, and a Grumman F-14A Tomcat used in the Top Gun movie sequel.

Accidents and incidents
On December 27, 2021, a Learjet 35 aircraft on a repositioning flight from John Wayne Airport crashed into a neighborhood east of El Cajon during an approach to Runway 27R. All four occupants were killed.

See also

Gillespie Field (San Diego Trolley station)
List of airports in California
List of United States Marine Corps installations
AirShow San Diego, annual June airshow, formerly "Wings Over Gillespie"

References
Notes

Bibliography

External links
Gillespie Pilots Association
Gillespie Field at County of San Diego website
Unofficial Gillespie Field with a complete list of Gillespie field museums, businesses, and weather
San Diego Air & Space Museum Gillespie Field Annex

Administrators Fact Book

Airports in San Diego County, California
Aerospace museums in California
Museums in San Diego County, California
El Cajon, California